Grzegorz Bartczak (born 21 June 1985 in Legnica) is a Polish professional footballer who plays as a right-back for Miedź Legnica II.

Career

Club

Previously he played for Zagłębie Lubin.

In June 2011, he joined Jagiellonia Białystok on a three-year contract but terminated his Jagiellonia contract by mutual consent in February 2012. He later joined Warta Poznań.

National team

He was called up to the Poland national football team by Leo Beenhakker for the games versus Azerbaijan and Armenia which took place on 24 and 28 March 2007.

Honours
Zagłębie Lubin
Ekstraklasa: 2006–07
Polish Super Cup: 2007

Miedź Legnica
I liga: 2017–18

References

External links
  
  

1985 births
Living people
People from Legnica
Sportspeople from Lower Silesian Voivodeship
Association football defenders
Polish footballers
Poland international footballers
Zagłębie Lubin players
Jagiellonia Białystok players
Warta Poznań players
Miedź Legnica players
Ekstraklasa players
I liga players
III liga players